Sedilia aphanitoma is an extinct species of sea snail, a marine gastropod mollusc in the family Drilliidae.

Description

Distribution
This extinct marine species was found in Quaternary strata of Florida, USA; age range: 2.588 to 0.781 Ma.

References

 Dall, W. H. "Contributions to the Tertiary fauna of Florida, Part 3: Wagner Free Inst. Sci." Trans 3 (1892): 349–350.
 A. J. W. Hendy, D. P. Buick, K. V. Bulinski, C. A. Ferguson, and A. I. Miller. 2008. Unpublished census data from Atlantic coastal plain and circum-Caribbean Neogene assemblages and taxonomic opinions.

External links

aphanitoma
Gastropods described in 1892